Finland has participated in the biennial classical music competition Eurovision Young Musicians 13 times since its debut in 1984, most recently taking part in 2008. The country's best result is three second-place finishes, in 1984, 2000 and 2008.

The nations were represented individually, following the introduction of a preliminary round, at the 1986 contest.

Participation overview

See also
Finland in the Eurovision Song Contest
Finland in the Eurovision Dance Contest

References

External links 
 Eurovision Young Musicians

Countries in the Eurovision Young Musicians
Finnish music